Emma Oudiou (born 2 January 1995) is a French athlete who competes in 3000 metre steeplechase events in international level events. She is a double bronze medalist in the European Athletics U23 Championships in this event.

References

1995 births
Living people
Athletes from Paris
French female steeplechase runners
French female middle-distance runners
Athletes (track and field) at the 2018 Mediterranean Games
Mediterranean Games competitors for France
21st-century French women